Travis Scott: Look Mom I Can Fly is a 2019 documentary directed by White Trash Tyler, produced by Travis Scott, Kylie Jenner, David Stromberg and Angus Wall and starring Scott. The documentary explores Travis's rise to fame in 2014 to where he  created and released his third studio album Astroworld. He takes his audience through a roller coaster of events which lead him to the point where he is today. The documentary includes footage of live concerts and performances, time spent with Scott's family, collaborations in the studio to prepare his album, fans and their perspectives of how their lives were changed by him, and flashbacks to his childhood which shaped him.

It was released August 28, 2019 on Netflix.

Cast
 Travis Scott
Chase B
 Stormi Webster
 Kylie Jenner
 Mike Dean
Don Toliver
Sheck Wes
Jacques Bermon Webster, Sr.
Kanye West
Wanda Webster

References

External links
 
 

2019 documentary films
2019 films
Netflix original documentary films
Documentary films about hip hop music and musicians
2010s English-language films